Tom de Dorlodot (born 20 June 1985) is a professional adventurer, paraglider pilot and public speaker. Born in Belgium, he is known for his exploratory journeys around the world, flying remote areas by paraglider and paramotor in places such as Pakistan, Madagascar and French Polynesia.

Biography
In 2011 he broke the Asian and Himalayan paragliding distance record with a flight of 226km in 10 hours and in 2022 he made a pioneering freeflight around the Karakorum mountains of Muztagh Tower, K2, Broad Peak and Gasherbrum of approximately 120km. As a sailor he has crossed the Atlantic three times, once solo. He has also competed in the Red Bull X-Alps, the biennual adventure race, every edition since 2007, which sees competitors hike and fly a route around the Alps over the course of 12 days. 

Other notable firsts and exploratory flights include: 

 The first paraglider flight from Machu Picchu, Peru, 2008. De Dorlodot was arrested afterwards. 
 The first paramotor flight above the ruins of Tikal, Guatemala, 2010.
 The first crossing of New Zealand's Southern Alps by hike and fly with Ferdinand Van Schelven in 2013.
 The first solo hike and fly crossing of the Pyrenees from Hondarribia to Cap de Creus in 13 days in 2013.
 The first hike and fly crossing of Colombia from Cali to Medellin. 
 Pioneering flights across Madagascar in 2016; after one, de Dorlodot landed in a minefield.

Between 2014-2016 de Dorlodot suffered a trilogy of accidents. In 2014 he broke his back in a paragliding accident while crossing the Adriatic – he successfully fought his way back to a full recovery, and completed the journey. A year later he broke his ankle and required rescuing from a steep face during the 2015 Red Bull X-Alps. The year after he severed a finger while rock climbing in Greece. 

Tom studied communication at IHECS in Brussels and has a masters in photography and movie directing. He is the founder of SEARCH Projects, a production company specializing in sport and adventure documentaries. His films have won many awards. They include the 2013 Karakoram Highway, directed by Olivier Boonjing, winning the public award and the best human adventure award at Coupe Icare Film Festival, and Fly Spiti, directed by Benoit Delfosse winning Best Aerial Adventure Film af the International Air Film Festival 2019. De Dorlodot also produced three seasons of his own TV series Explore, which was broadcast on the Belgian TV network RTL.  

In 2016 he authored the book, L’aventure de la création d’entreprise about the parallels between being an adventurer and an entrepreneur.  

De Dorlodot is based in the Azores, where he lives with his wife Sofia Pineiro and two children Jack and Leonor.

References 

1985 births
Living people
Paraglider pilots